Coolup is a small town in the Peel region of Western Australia. The town is situated just off the South Western Highway and close to the Murray River. Coolup is home to the proposed new multimillion-dollar Murray Region Equestrian Centre, whose construction is in the initial stages of development.

The area was first settled in 1886 and the townsite was gazetted in 1899. The town's name is Aboriginal Australian in origin and is thought to mean the place of the wild turkey.

References 

Shire of Murray
Populated places established in 1899